Xu Bin (born 19 February 1989) is a Chinese actor based in Singapore. He is managed under NoonTalk Media and was named as one of the 8 Dukes of Caldecott Hill.

Life and career
Xu was born in Fuzhou, China, and moved to Singapore to pursue his studies. When he was 17, he participated in Singaporean singing competition Campus SuperStar, representing Woodlands Ring Secondary School, but was eliminated during the first round of competition. After graduating from Temasek Polytechnic in 2012, he was given a role in Singaporean movie Timeless Love.

In 2013, Xu was awarded the Favourite Male Character in Star Awards 2013. In 2014, he was nominated the Most Favourite On-screen Couple with Julie Tan in Star Awards 20. In 2015, Xu released his second single, . He also took part in an online variety show, . In 2020, Xu was appointed as the spokesperson for Beijing 101 Hair Consultants.

Personal life
On 3 November 2017, Xu and Evelyn Wang Yifei conducted their first wedding ceremony in Singapore. They subsequently held two more ceremonies in their respective hometowns, Fujian and Wuhan. Wang is a Beijing Film Academy graduate who chose to help in her family's property business instead of entering the entertainment industry. Both met at a mutual friend's party in 2014. However, their relationship was kept hidden as NoonTalk Media, Xu's managing agency, had a dating ban for all its artistes, which was lifted in 2016 for Xu and Aloysius Pang as they had "reached the right age".

On 10 July 2018, Xu announced the birth of his first child, a son, Ethan Xu. Ethan's name was among the English names shortlisted by Aloysius Pang before his death who was asked to help to give the baby an English name. On 12 March 2021, Xu announced the birth of his second child, a daughter, named Elyse. , the Xu family is based in Singapore.

Filmography

Discography

Singles

Compilation albums

Awards and nominations

References

External links
Xu Bin on toggle.sg

1989 births
Singers from Fujian
Living people
Singaporean television personalities
Male actors from Fujian
Chinese male television actors
Chinese male film actors
Temasek Polytechnic alumni
21st-century Chinese male singers